General Wade Hampton Haislip (July 9, 1889 – December 23, 1971) was a senior United States Army officer who served in both World War I and World War II, where he led XV Corps on the Western Front from 1944 to 1945. He later became a four-star general, serving as Vice Chief of Staff of the United States Army (VCSA) from 1949 to 1951.

Military career

Haislip was born in Woodstock, Virginia, on July 9, 1889, and moved at age two to Staunton, Virginia. He was commissioned a second lieutenant of infantry upon graduating from the United States Military Academy at West Point in 1912. Among his fellow graduates included several future general officers like Walton Walker, John Shirley Wood, Gilbert R. Cook, Harry J. Malony, William H. Wilbur, Walter M. Robertson, Franklin C. Sibert and Raymond O. Barton.

Haislip served in Vera Cruz, Mexico, in 1914 after the Tampico Affair. From 1917 to 1921, he served with the American Expeditionary Forces, first in World War I, then in the occupation of Germany. During his time overseas his assignments included being on the General Staff of V Corps; Division Machine Gun Officer for the 3rd Division, and General Staff, U.S. Forces in Germany. During World War I he participated in the Battle of Saint-Mihiel and the Meuse–Argonne Offensive.

He returned to West Point as an instructor from 1921 to 1923. He next attended a series of schools, beginning with the U.S. Army Infantry School from 1923 to 1924, then the Command and General Staff School from 1924 to 1925, and finally going back overseas to attend the French École supérieure de guerre from 1925 to 1927. He returned to the United States as assistant executive in the office of Assistant Secretary of War from 1928 to 1931, followed by the Army War College from 1931 to 1932, and an assignment as an instructor at the Command and General Staff School from 1932 to 1936.

Prior to World War II he held a series of staff assignments, including time in the Budget and Legislative Planning Branch of the War Department General Staff from 1938 to 1941, and Assistant Chief-of-Staff for personnel.

In World War II he served very briefly as assistant division commander (ADC) of the 4th Infantry Division. He organized the 85th Infantry Division and served as commander from April 1942 to February 1943 until he was succeeded by Brigadier General John B. Coulter, his ADC. He next took command of XV Corps and served with it through Normandy, France, Rhineland, and Central Europe campaigns. He became commander of Seventh United States Army, and was in that billet when World War II ended in August 1945.

Following the war he was on the Secretary of War's Personnel Board from September 1945 to April 1946, and a senior member of the Chief-of-Staff's Advisory Group from 1946 to 1948. Prior to his selection in 1949 as Vice Chief of Staff he was Deputy Chief-of-Staff for administration, 1948–49. He retired in 1951.

Haislip is responsible for introducing Dwight D. Eisenhower to Mamie Doud. Eisenhower was a second lieutenant and Haislip a first lieutenant at Fort Sam Houston at the time. At Eisenhower's funeral, he served as a pall-bearer.

Major assignments
 Assistant Chief-of-Staff for personnel – February 9, 1941 to January 19, 1942
 Assistant Division Commander, 4th Motorized Division – January 20, 1942 to March 9, 1942
 Commander, 85th Infantry Division – March 9, 1942 to February 22, 1943
 Commander, XV Corps – February 23, 1943 to June 1, 1945
 Commander, Seventh United States Army –  June 2, 1945 to July 23, 1946
 President, Secretary of War's Personnel Board – August 23, 1945 to April 30, 1946
 Senior member of the Chief-of-Staff's Advisory Group – May 15, 1946 to June 1, 1948
 Special Assistant to the Chief-of-Staff, U.S. Army – June 1, 1948 to November 15, 1948
 Deputy Chief-of-Staff for Administration –  November 15, 1948 to August 23, 1949.
 Vice Chief of Staff of the United States Army – August 23, 1949 to July 31, 1951

Post military career
After retiring from active duty in 1951, Haislip went on to become Governor of the Soldier's Home in Washington, D.C., a position he filled from 1951 to 1966.

Haislip died on December 23, 1971, at Walter Reed Army Medical Center after suffering a stroke, and was buried in Arlington National Cemetery. His wife, the former Alice Jennings Shepherd (1897–1987), whom he had married on July 14, 1932, was later buried beside him.

Dates of rank

Source:

Bibliography

References

External links
Generals of World War II
United States Army Officers 1939–1945

|-

|-

|-

1889 births
1971 deaths
United States Army personnel of World War I
United States Army Command and General Staff College faculty
Burials at Arlington National Cemetery
Military personnel from Virginia
People from Staunton, Virginia
People from Woodstock, Virginia
Recipients of the Distinguished Service Medal (US Army)
Recipients of the Legion of Merit
United States Army Command and General Staff College alumni
United States Army Vice Chiefs of Staff
United States Military Academy alumni
United States Army generals of World War II
United States Army generals
United States Military Academy faculty